Cacahuamilpa's Grottos (Grutas de Cacahuamilpa in Spanish) is an oil painting finished in 1835 by Jean-Baptiste Louis Gros, after his second visit to the caves in Grutas de Cacahuamilpa National Park, in Guerrero, Mexico.  It is now in the Museo Soumaya, Mexico City.

Features 
The picture, in a naturalist style, shows a group using the rocks as a table. The chiaroscuro arises from the lights of the expeditioners, giving a Romantic feeling.

References 

1835 paintings
Arts in Mexico
Arts in Mexico City
Culture in Mexico City